Kaitoku Seamount (海徳海山 in Japanese) is an active submarine complex volcano located in the Bonin Islands of Japan.

Geography
Saikai Tokuba, the non-eruptive part of the volcano, has a stratovolcanic structure with a flatter peak. Tokai Tokuba, the eruptive part of the volcano, is a caldera with the active cone on the peak.

Composition
Despite the northern peak having basaltic composition, the pumice from Tokai Tokuba's 1984 eruption was recorded to be dacitic.

Geologic setting
The Volcano Islands range which Kaitoku is situated within is a part of the Izu-Mariana range which is caused by the subduction of the Pacific Plate under the Philippine Sea Plate.

Activity

Kaitoku has had an activity period in 1543, 1984, 2001 and 2022, the most documented one being the 1984 eruption. All of these eruptions have been rather weak, with a Volcanic Explosivity Index of 0. The volcano is actively monitored by the Japan Coast Guard.

1984 eruption
In March 7 1984, the Japanese Coast Guard reported discolored water near the volcano. The next day, the volcano reportedly started erupting rocks which didn't reach the sea surface. In March 16, a reef-like pile of black rocks rose onto the sea surface. In July, the activity of the volcano completely ceased.

Chemical composition
After the 1984 eruption in March, pumice rock was collected which had a composition of 62.3% silicon dioxide, 5.2% sodium oxide and 1.4% potassium oxide. 7 samples of discolored water were taken and were observed by research vessels which found a pH level of 7.8-8.11 which correlates to basic composition.

Mystery cloud

It was suspected that a "mystery cloud" 180 miles off the east coast of Japan spotted by 3 crews of separate airliners on 9 April 1984 was connected to the Kaitoku Seamount, which coincidentally was erupting in the same period. Later, following research, it was proven that it was very likely not from Kaitoku but rather from a 'natural phenomenon' or a man-made explosion.

2022 activity
There were several months of activity within 2022 for Kaitoku which were August, October, November and December. In August, only discolored water was observed, however in October and November, the extrusion of rocks breached the surface and in December the pile of pumice travelled 10 km away from the vent of the volcano. The December activity has continued into 2023.

Gallery

See also
Suiyo Seamount
Nishinojima

References

Volcanoes of Japan
Seamounts of the Pacific Ocean
Submarine volcanoes